Khmer Symbols is a Unicode block containing lunar date symbols, used in the writing system of the Khmer (Cambodian) language. For further details see Khmer alphabet – Unicode.

History
The following Unicode-related documents record the purpose and process of defining specific characters in the Khmer Symbols block:

References 

Unicode blocks
Khmer language